Dimitar Pantev (born 26 June 1976) is a Bulgarian professional football manager and former player. He is currently manager of Sierra Leone National Premier League club Johansen.

As a manager, he has worked for Vladislav Varna, Shabla, futsal club Grand Pro Varna, Bulgaria national futsal team, Spartak Varna, Palestinian club Alshoban Almuslimin Hebron, Svetkavitsa Targovishte and Victoria United in Cameroon.

Playing career 
Born in Varna, Pantev began his football career at Cherno More in 1995. After a loan spells with Suvorovo and Devnya, he moved permanently to Suvorovo in 1998. Then he played for Chernomorets Byala, Kaliakra Kavarna, Chernomorets Balchik, Volov Shumen, Dobrudzha Dobrich and Vladislav Varna. He ended his playing career with Shabla in 2011. Four years later, at the age of 39, Pantev returned to playing as a player-manager of Spartak Varna, and played one season before retiring again in June 2016.

Managerial career

Early career 
Pantev began his managerial career as a youth coach in Varna City. During 2008–09 season he was a playing assistant coach of Dobrudzha Dobrich. He also worked as a head coach of Vladislav Varna and Shabla in the Bulgarian Third League.

Futsal 
In 2011 Pantev was appointed playing manager of futsal club Grand Pro Varna. During his 6 years with the club he won five consecutive Bulgarian Premiere Futsal League titles, leading the club to the Elite round of 2013–14 UEFA Futsal Cup. He also managed two times Bulgaria national futsal team.

Spartak Varna 
On 31 August 2015, Pantev was appointed manager of Spartak Varna, leading the club to promotion to the Third League in 2016.

In Asia 
In 2018–19 season, Pantev was an assistant coach of Palestinian club Al Ahli Hebron. In July 2019, he became a manager of Alshoban Almuslimin Hebron. In early 2020, Pantev was appointed technical director and head coach of Indian Youth Academy H16.

Victoria United 
In July 2022, Pantev was appointed manager of Victoria United in Cameroon, with whom he won 2022 South West Regional League.

Honours

Manager

Futsal 
Grand Pro Varna
Bulgarian Futsal League (5): 2011–12, 2012–13, 2013–14, 2014–15, 2015–16

Football 
Spartak Varna
A RFG – Varna: 2015–16

Victoria United
South West Regional League: 2022

References

External links
Profile at zerozero.pt

1976 births
Living people
Bulgarian footballers
Association football midfielders
PFC Kaliakra Kavarna players
FC Chernomorets Balchik players
PFC Dobrudzha Dobrich players
PFC Spartak Varna players
Bulgarian football managers
Bulgarian expatriate football managers
Sportspeople from Varna, Bulgaria